Los Cañoneros (The Cannoneers) is a Venezuelan cañonero group. It was created to emulate the times and songs of Caracas in 1920. They made their first public appearance in Mérida, in the Bullfighting Arena of Mérida November 20, 1982.

They were an overwhelming success in Caracas, enlivening parties and private shows. Then came the professionalization by recording several albums, performing on radio and television. They are led by Hely and Ylich Orsini.

They have toured in Spain, Germany, Portugal and the Caribbean countries.

The "cañonera music" is a musical style born in the capital of Venezuela in the early 20th century. It is the first urban musical expression in this country. It has many similarities with the Dixieland developed in New Orleans. The groups that play "cañonera" music include several Venezuelan rhythms like the Venezuelan merengue, a variant of the pasodoble, joropo, and Venezuelan waltz.

As of 2017 there are only two groups dedicated to preserving the traditional music of Caracas: Los Antaños del Stadium (1946) and Los Cañoneros.

Their most recent record is Esta es Caracas (2012), a Venezuelan merengue featuring some of the most important singers in Venezuela: Cecilia Todd, Horacio Blanco (lead vocal for the ska band Desorden Publico), Ramsés Meneses a.k.a. McKlopedia, Aristides Barbella, Max Pizzolante, Francisco Pacheco and Serenata Guayanesa. Their more successful songs include La Burra "The Donkey", La Ruperta ", El Romantón and Mataron al chivo "They Killed the Goat".

See also 

Venezuela
Venezuelan music
Venezuelan merengue

References

External links 
 www.loscanoneros.net - Official site
 Los Cañoneros - At Sincopa.com (English)
 Los Cañoneros - At MusicaVenezuela.com

Additional sources

 Azpúrua, Miguel "Efemérides Musicales de Latinoamérica". pp 332. Editorial Horizonte 
 Press release of the Ministry of Culture(Spanish)
 VenezuelaDemo (PDF)

Venezuelan musical groups